Pulse CMS is simple software designed for small websites that enables a web developer to add web content management system capabilities to an existing site "easily and quickly". The web developer is tasked to delineate editable "blocks" for the website, and Pulse CMS is then utilized by authorized users for making edits through the system's simple web application user interface.

Features 
PulseCMS has a WYSIWYG content editor, media manager, gallery function, blog, and backup system.

Software Requirements 

 Web server with Apache and PHP 5.
 No database required (Pulse CMS uses flat files).

Support 
Support for paying customers is available directly from the developer.

Reviews 
 How To Have The Functionality Of A CMS On Any Old Website, makeuseof.com
 Simple CMS For Static Websites – Pulse CMS, webresourcesdepot.com

See also
 Content management system
 List of content management systems

References

External links
 Official site of Pulse CMS

Content management systems